The chief minister of France or, closer to the French term, chief minister of state, or prime minister of France were and are informal titles given to various personages who received various degrees of power to rule the Kingdom of France on behalf of the monarch during the Ancien Régime ("Old Regime"). The titles were however informal and used more as job descriptions.

History
Like the title of Chief Minister was unofficial, the monarch maintained all his powers, giving to the Chief Minister the task to make effective his orders. However, during moments were the king was absent from the country, highly sick, indifferent or unfit to govern, the Chief Minister had a strong role, becoming the real mind behind the state's operating.

Usually, the Chief Ministers were members of the King's Council (the archaic form of cabinet) or high members of the French nobility or the Catholic clergy.

From 1661, Louis XIV and his successors refused to allow any one of their ministers to be deemed more important than others, so the term was not in use. The title of 'First Minister of State' was used, however the old title was not brought back after Louis XIV.

With the eruption of the French Revolution in 1789, the First Minister of State progressively lost importance and influence inside national politics. Finally, with the coming of the constitutional monarchy in 1791, the title of First Minister ceased to exist.

List

First French Empire (1804–1814)

Kingdom of France (1814–1815)

Hundred Days (1815)

See also
History of France
Ancien Régime
Lord Chancellor of France
Prime Minister of France
List of prime ministers of France

References

Political history of France
Government of France
Heads of government

1580s establishments in France
1790s disestablishments in France